The 1964 Colgate Red Raiders football team was an American football team that represented Colgate University as an independent during the 1964 NCAA University Division football season. In its third consecutive season under head coach Hal Lahar (his eighth overall), the team compiled a 7–2 record. Lee Woltman was the team captain. 

The team played its home games at Colgate Athletic Field in Hamilton, New York.

Schedule

Leading players 
Statistical leaders for the 1964 Red Raiders included: 
 Rushing: Lee Woltman, 402 yards and 2 touchdowns on 102 attempts
 Passing: Gerald Barudin, 605 yards, 46 completions and 4 touchdowns on 97 attempts
 Receiving: Peter Beaulieu, 347 yards and 3 touchdowns on 18 receptions
 Total offense: Gerald Barudin, 805 yards (605 passing, 200 rushing)
 Scoring: Gerald Barudin, 30 points from 5 touchdowns
 All-purpose yards: Lee Woltman, 767 yards (402 rushing, 192 receiving, 138 kickoff returning, 35 punt returning)

References

Colgate
Colgate Raiders football seasons
Colgate Red Raiders football